Elizabeth Taylor appeared in numerous movies and television shows from 1942 through 2001.

Feature films

Television

Other appearances
Other appearances have included: Interviews with David Frost, Barbara Walters, Phil Donahue, and Larry King; various profiles of Michael Jackson; The Freddie Mercury Tribute Concert; and Elizabeth Taylor: England's Other Elizabeth in 2000.

Her General Hospital cameo appearance coincided with the wedding of Luke and Laura.

References

Actress filmographies
Filmography
American filmographies
British filmographies